"Slapsgiving" is the ninth episode in the third season of the television series How I Met Your Mother and 53rd overall. It originally aired on November 19, 2007.

Plot 
Ted tells his kids about a private joke he and Robin used to share while they were dating: they would salute whenever another person used a word that sounded like a military rank before another word in a sentence (an example being 'Kernel (Colonel) Stuck In My Teeth'), but since breaking up they simply share awkward looks whenever someone does it. Future Ted also explains that they can no longer spend time alone together.

Thanksgiving is approaching, and this will be the group’s first with Marshall and Lily as a married couple. Lily is obsessing over making sure it is perfect, Robin has invited her 41 year old boyfriend Bob, who Ted perceives to be ancient, to Thanksgiving dinner, and Marshall is terrorizing Barney in the days leading up to Barney's third slap and has even set up a countdown website. When Robin and Ted are the only two members of the group to show up to a night of baking pies, they notice that they have nothing to talk about when they are together, creating a nagging feeling that they are no longer really friends.

When Ted and Robin arrive at Marshall and Lily's apartment for Thanksgiving, Lily is floundering to get the apartment ready for their dinner. Ted and Robin reveal separately that they fought while baking but ended the night by having sex. Robin and Lily decide that Robin and Ted need to talk about what happened, while Ted, Marshall, and Barney have decided they must ignore it. Robin and Ted argue again and Lily forces them to talk it out. After the two discuss how weird it is to be around each other, they come to the realization that they're not friends and agree that after the dinner they shouldn't see each other again. Meanwhile, Barney begins to get upset at the notion of another slap. Following Marshall's relentless taunting of Barney and lack of interest in helping her prepare, Lily declares as Slap Bet Commissioner that no slap would occur on Thanksgiving, much to Barney's delight and Marshall's dismay.

Everyone sits down for Thanksgiving dinner and Lily is upset that no one is taking it very seriously. Robin and Ted exchange sad glances with each other. Marshall speaks up and thanks Lily for her hard work in putting together the dinner. Later during dinner Bob uses the phrase 'major buzzkill', and Ted and Robin absent-mindedly salute, causing them to realize there's still a connection between them and they can still be friends. Future Ted tells his kids that he had a great evening with his friends (and Bob), and that's why he takes them to Marshall and Lily's to spend Thanksgiving every year. Barney begins to taunt dismayed Marshall as the slap countdown enters the last ten seconds. At first Lily warns him not to go through with the slap, but when Barney keeps taunting, she allows the slap to happen with only three seconds to go. Overjoyed, Marshall slaps Barney immediately sending him flying across the room before singing "You Just Got Slapped" (a song of his own creation) with everybody.

In the kitchen after dinner, Ted notes there's going to be a 'major clean-up' making everyone unknowingly salute and despair. Marshall asks if this is going to be a regular occurrence from now on and Robin replies, "That's the general idea," causing another salute.

Critical response 

Donna Bowman of The A.V. Club rated the episode B.

Eric Goldman of IGN gave the episode 8.5 out of 10. He describes the slap bet as one of the funniest running jokes of the series. Goldman was also impressed by how well Neil Patrick Harris took the slap, describing it as "like Biff Tannen taking a punch from George McFly".

Entertainment Weekly put it on its end-of-the-decade, "best-of" list, saying, "After winning permission to slap Barney in a bet, Marshall renames Turkey Day in 2007. Slapstick ensues, setting the stage for "Slapsgiving 2" in 2009. Did we mention it's a real knee-slapper?"

References

External links 
 

2007 American television episodes
How I Met Your Mother (season 3) episodes
Thanksgiving television episodes
Fictional holidays